Elizabeth Barry (1658–1713) was an English actress.

Elizabeth Barry may also refer to:

Elizabeth Barry (sailor) from August 2011 in sports
Beth Barry, North and South Women's Amateur Golf Championship
Liz Barry of Talk to Me (NYC)